A by-election for the Australian House of Representatives seat of Wentworth took place on 20 October 2018 after the parliamentary resignation of the former Prime Minister of Australia and incumbent Liberal MP Malcolm Turnbull.

The seat was won by independent candidate Kerryn Phelps, with a swing of almost twenty percent away from the Liberal Party. In early counting, just over an hour after the close of polls, the Australian Broadcasting Corporation's election analyst Antony Green predicted Phelps would win the by-election. It is the first time since the inaugural 1901 election that the seat has not been represented by the Liberals, its predecessors, or party defectors.

Background

Wentworth

The Liberal Party of Australia and its predecessors have continuously held Wentworth since the inaugural 1901 election, except for the brief party defections of Walter Marks in 1929 and Peter King in 2004. Wentworth was a stronghold for over 80 years, until the 1984 expansion of parliament and its redistribution saw Wentworth's Liberal margin notionally reduced by 7%, changing Wentworth from a safe Liberal seat with margins usually well in excess of 10%, to a more marginal seat which produced single-digit Liberal margins for the next 25 years. Defeating former Liberal and independent incumbent Peter King, Liberal candidate Malcolm Turnbull first won Wentworth at the 2004 election on a reduced 5.5% Liberal margin, following a 2.4% swing against the national and state trend. At the change-of-government 2007 election a redistribution reduced the Liberal margin to a notional 2.5%, but was retained with an increased Liberal margin of 3.9%, also against the national and state trend. Turnbull replaced Brendan Nelson as Liberal leader at the September 2008 Liberal leadership ballot, however Tony Abbott replaced Turnbull as Liberal leader at the December 2009 Liberal leadership ballot. At the 2010 election, the seat went from being marginal to safe in one stroke with a 14.9% margin from an 11% swing which saw the seat become the ninth-safest Liberal seat in the nation. At the change-of-government 2013 election there was a further increase which saw the seat become the sixth-safest Liberal seat in the nation with a 17.72% Liberal margin. Turnbull replaced Abbott as Liberal leader and prime minister at the September 2015 Liberal leadership ballot. A redistribution in Wentworth increased the Liberal margin to a notional 18.9%, however at the 2016 election, a swing away saw the Liberal margin slightly reduced to 17.75% but became the fifth-safest Liberal seat in the nation.

Liberal Party leadership spills

The by-election came after Scott Morrison replaced Turnbull as Liberal leader and prime minister on 24 August 2018, following the second of two Liberal leadership ballots held that month, which saw Morrison win the ballot against Peter Dutton with 45 votes to 40 after third-placed Julie Bishop was eliminated and the 11 votes she achieved were re-cast in the final two-candidate run-off. Turnbull won the first Liberal leadership ballot against Dutton, which was held three days before the second ballot, by 48 votes to 35. In the secondary spill, Turnbull did not contest the ballot for leader after losing a motion to spill the leadership by 45 votes to 40. Turnbull had previously indicated that he would leave parliament immediately if his party removed him as Liberal leader and prime minister. On 31 August 2018, one week after the second leadership spill, Turnbull submitted his resignation to the Speaker of the House of Representatives.

Minority Coalition government
Turnbull's departure dropped the Liberal-National Coalition in to minority government, with Nationals MP Kevin Hogan having declared he would move to the crossbench in protest immediately following the second spill. Hogan indicated he would remain a Nationals MP and provide confidence and supply support to the Coalition.  Independent Cathy McGowan has indicated that she will not support a motion of no confidence in the Morrison Government before the Wentworth by-election has been decided. Rebekha Sharkie stated that she would review her position after the Wentworth by-election.

Liberal Party pre-selection
The Liberal Party preselected their candidate, Dave Sharma, on 14 September. Other candidates for preselection included: Peter King, barrister and Turnbull's predecessor in Wentworth; Mary-Lou Jarvis, Woollahra councillor; Richard Shields, Woollahra councillor; Katherine O'Regan, Sydney East Business Chamber chair; Michael Feneley, cardiologist; Carrington Brigham, digital campaign business director; and Maxine Szramka, rheumatologist. Christine Forster, City of Sydney councillor and the sister of former Prime Minister Tony Abbott, announced her intention to seek preselection but then withdrew. Preselection front-runner Andrew Bragg, former Acting Federal Director of the Liberal Party and current executive at the Business Council of Australia, withdrew from the preselection contest on 10 September, citing his preference for a female Liberal candidate. Prime Minister Scott Morrison reportedly endorsed O'Regan for preselection, while former prime ministers Turnbull and John Howard endorsed Sharma.  Following this, Katherine O'Regan called for the Liberal Party's fighting fund for women to be accessible to women seeking pre-selection.

Campaign

Turnbull quit Australia for New York where he remained for the duration of the by-election, refusing requests to assist the Party in retaining its one-seat Parliamentary majority by campaigning for Sharma. While in New York, Turnbull told an audience: "When you stop being prime minister, that's it. There is no way I'd be hanging around like embittered Kevin Rudd or Tony Abbott. Seriously, these people are like, sort of miserable, miserable ghosts." At the outset of Liberal preselection, he tweeted support for preselection of candidate Dave Sharma after Morrison had called for a female candidate. On October 18, he liked a tweet favouring Phelps. From New York, Turnbull lobbied his former colleagues to refer his leadership rival Peter Dutton to the High Court over his eligibility to sit in Parliament and tweeting "The point I have made to @ScottMorrisonMP and other colleagues is that given the uncertainty around Peter Dutton's eligibility, acknowledged by the Solicitor General, he should be referred to the High Court, as Barnaby was, to clarify the matter." In September 2018, it was reported that his son Alex Turnbull was supporting the Labor Party at the by-election.

When announcing her campaign, Kerryn Phelps urged voters to "put the Liberals last". She later published how-to-vote cards giving the Liberals a preference above Labor.  Phelps became a prominent candidate in the by-election, with it being suggested that her preferences would be able to get Sharma over the line.

In response to Phelps directing her preferences to Liberal candidate Sharma, the ALP employed the strategy of "running dead" with the intent of seeing their candidate Tim Murray coming in third place which would result in ALP preferences being distributed to Phelps and helping her to win the seat.

The Lord Mayor of Sydney, Clover Moore, backed independent candidate Licia Heath, despite having worked with Phelps on the City of Sydney council.

On 26 September 2018 Sharma's campaign team was accused by other candidates of removing their campaign posters and replacing them with Sharma's posters.

On 7 October, The Sunday Telegraph reported allegations that Katter's Australian Party candidate Robert Callanan was a former director of a company associated with a brothel, leading Callanan to be disendorsed by the party.

On 10 October, part of the Ruddock review into religious freedoms in Australia was leaked.

Former Liberal Party leader and former MP for Wentworth John Hewson publicly said the seat is "ripe for protest vote", and urged constituents to vote against the Liberal Party, especially due to its lack of climate change policies.

On 15 October, Scott Morrison announced a review of whether Australia's embassy in Israel should be moved from Tel Aviv to Jerusalem. Morrison also announced funding of $2 million for a surf lifesaving club in the electorate, and $2.2 million for security at Jewish community venues and events.

In the last week of the campaign, an email was sent to hundreds of Wentworth constituents which falsely reported that Phelps was withdrawing from the by-election due to being diagnosed with HIV. The email then encouraged the recipient to give their first preference vote to the Liberal candidate Sharma and to remove Phelps' campaign posters. An investigation into the email revealed that it was likely sent from one of 500,000 Dodo and iPrimus email addresses. Sharma and the Liberal Party condemned the email and denied any involvement.

Key dates
Key dates in relation to the by-election were:
 Monday, 17 September 2018 – Issue of writ
 Monday, 24 September 2018 – Close of electoral rolls (8pm)
 Thursday, 27 September 2018 – Close of nominations (12 noon)
 Friday, 28 September 2018 – Declaration of nominations (12 noon)
 Tuesday, 2 October 2018 – Start of early voting
 Saturday, 20 October 2018 – Polling day (8am to 6pm)
 Friday, 2 November 2018 – Last day for receipt of postal votes
 Wednesday, 26 December 2018 – Last day for return of writs

Candidates

Polling

The first public opinion poll of the by-election, conducted by ReachTEL during the evening of Monday 27 August 2018, produced a tied 50-50 two-party-preferred result between Liberal and Labor, which represented a massive 17.7% swing from Liberal to Labor since the previous election. Election analyst Antony Green partially attributed the size of the swing to the loss of Turnbull's significant personal vote. On 16 October, it was reported that the Liberal party's internal polling showed data that represented a 55% Phelps to 45% Sharma two-candidate-preferred vote result.

Results

At 7:18pm AEDT, just over an hour after the close of polls, the Australian Broadcasting Corporation's psephologist Antony Green predicted independent candidate Kerryn Phelps to win the by-election, although the margin of victory for Phelps tightened as pre-poll and postal votes were counted.

Distribution of preferences

Aftermath
It is the first time since the inaugural 1901 election that the seat has not been represented by the Liberals, its predecessors, or party defectors. The outcome saw the Liberal-National Coalition slip further into minority government, holding only 74 seats out of 150 in the House of Representatives, having lost majority government two months earlier when Nationals MP Kevin Hogan moved to the crossbench while continuing his confidence and supply support.

The by-election is credited with highlighting the health concerns for refugee children detained in Nauru to the Morrison Government's attention, and subsequently transporting some of them to Australia for medical treatment.

See also
 Electoral results for the Division of Wentworth
 2018 Liberal Party of Australia leadership spills
 List of Australian federal by-elections

References

External links
2018 Wentworth by-election website: Australian Electoral Commission
2018 Wentworth by-election guide: Antony Green ABC
2018 Wentworth by-election guide: The Poll Bludger
2018 Wentworth by-election guide: The Tally Room

2018 elections in Australia
New South Wales federal by-elections
October 2018 events in Australia